Roditis is a village and a community of the municipality of Servia. The 2011 census recorded 263 inhabitants in the village and 290 in the respective community.

Administrative division
The community of Roditis consists of two separate settlements:
Roditis (population 263)
Kouvouklia (population 27)
The aforementioned populations are as of 2011.

References

Populated places in Kozani (regional unit)